Dennis McNamara (8 March 1935 – 23 June 2017) was an English footballer, who played as a winger in the Football League for Tranmere Rovers.

References

Tranmere Rovers F.C. players
English Football League players
Association football wingers
Living people
1935 births
English footballers
Footballers from Liverpool